Gevorg Harutjunyan (born May 7, 1981) is an Armenian chess grandmaster. In 2008, he achieved 6.0/9 in the 10th Rector Cup, in joint first alongside Alexander Onischuk and Mikhail Brodsky, but tiebreak decider games brought him down to 3rd place. He also participated in the Dubai Open 2010, where he defeated Gadir Guseinov in 29 moves. He became a grandmaster in 2009 after crossing 2500 fide, but since has mainly remained below 2500. In 2019, he won the December Evenings B-Group in Chelyabinsk.

Notes

External links
 
 
 
 

Chess grandmasters
Armenian chess players
1981 births
Living people